Sachi is a given name. Notable people with the name include:

 Sachi Amma (born 1989), Japanese professional rock climber
 Sachi Hamano (born 1948), Japanese film director
 Sachi Kagawa, Japanese football player
 Sachi Kokuryu (born 1984), Japanese actress and voice actress
 Sachi Koto (born 1951), American businesswoman and CNN news anchor
 Sachi Matsumoto (born 1973), Japanese voice actress
 Sachi Mochida (born 1999), Japanese swimmer
 Sachi Ozawa (born 1976), Japanese speed skater
 Sachi Parker (born 1956), American actress
 Sachi Sri Kantha (born 1953), Sri Lanka-born scientist and historian
 Sachi Tainaka (born 1986), Japanese singer
 Sachi Tamashiro (born 1980), Mexican telenovela actress
Indrasakdi Sachi (1902–1975), royal consort of King Vajiravudh (Rama VI) of Siam
 Sachi Komine, character from the Grisaia visual novel series

See also
 Podothecus sachi or Japanese poacher, a fish in the family Agonidae
 Sachi-Sethu, a Malayalam screenwriter duo
 Sachy (disambiguation)
 Greta Scacchi (born 1960), Italian Australian actress

Japanese feminine given names
Sinhalese feminine given names